Enneacampus  is a genus of freshwater pipefishes native to Africa.

Etymology 
The genus name comes from the Greek ennea meaning "nine times" and kampe meaning "curvature."

Species
There are currently two recognized species in this genus:
 Enneacampus ansorgii (Boulenger, 1910)
 Enneacampus kaupi (Bleeker, 1863)

References

Syngnathidae
Freshwater fish genera
Taxa named by Charles Eric Dawson